Cloudland is a former entertainment venue in Brisbane, Australia.

Cloudland may also refer to:

 Cloudland (adventure), a fantasy role-playing game adventure
 Cloudland (album), by Pere Ubu, 1989
 Cloudland, Georgia, an unincorporated community in western Chattooga County
 Cloudland High School, a public high school in Roan Mountain, Tennessee

Other uses
 Cloudland Canyon State Park, a state park in Georgia, U.S.A.
 Cloudland Canyon (band), an American psychedelic rock band